Andy Slater (born December 15, 1978),  is an American sports radio talk show host. The Andy Slater Show is syndicated on WMEN 640-AM Fox Sports in Royal Palm Beach, Florida and on iHeartRadio.

Education
Slater started his broadcasting career at Miami Killian Senior High and at Franklin Pierce College, located in Rindge, New Hampshire. Slater also received awards for Sports Show of the Year while attending Lynn University in Boca Raton, Florida.

Career
In early 2008, Slater started hosting The Andy Slater Show. Slater also often appears on Miami's local ABC affiliate WPLG. Slater was last person to sit down with and publicly interview O.J. Simpson in June 2008 before he was sentenced to prison.

Slater was one of six judges for Miss Florida USA 2016, and Miss Florida USA 2017.

Slater breaks national stories, which he calls the "Slater Scoop." Among them, the tragic death of Jose Fernandez, Jason Pierre-Paul injuring his hand in a fireworks accident, and Dion Waiters gummy incident on the Miami Heat's team plane.

Recognition
The Miami Herald named Slater the best sports reporter in South Florida.

Slater was named best radio personality and the hardest-working radio reporter by the Miami New Times.

References

External links
 Andy Slater joins 940-AM WINZ weekday lineup
 640-AM WMEN Radio in South Florida
 Andy Slater on WPBF-TV in West Palm Beach

American sports radio personalities
Lynn University alumni
1978 births
Living people